Live At The Pretty Ugly Club is a live album by Pretty Boy Floyd, it is their only live album to date. It also featured two new studio tracks.

The Pretty Ugly Club where it was recorded, is a rock club in Hollywood ran by Taime Downe of Faster Pussycat.

The last two tracks are studio recordings.

Track listing
 Junkie Girl
 Rock'N'Roll Outlaws
 Good Girl Gone Bad
 Shock The World
 Leather Boyz With Electric Toyz
 Shut Up
 Your Mamma Won't Know
 48 Hours
 7 Minutes In Heaven
 Rock'N'Roll Is Gonna Set The Night On Fire
 Don't Save Your Love
 It's Still Rock 'n' Roll to Me (Billy Joel cover)

Band
Steve "Sex" Summers - lead vocals
Kristy "Krash" Majors - guitar, vocals
Lesli Sanders - bass, vocals
Dish - drums

Credits
Phil Soussan - mastering
Brian Haught- engineer, mixing

References

Pretty Boy Floyd (American band) albums
2001 live albums